Na Lepem Prijazni (transl. Suddenly Polite (Ones)) is a Slovenian and Yugoslav jazz rock band formed in Ljubljana in 1979.

Formed by singer-songwriter Andrej Trobentar, Na Lepem Prijazni were one of the last bands of the Yugoslav progressive rock scene to gain audience and media attention in the wake of Yugoslav punk and Yugoslav new wave scenes. The band released their debut self-titled album in 1981, ending their activity soon after its release. The band reunited in 2005, releasing three studio albums since.

History

1978–1981
Na Lepem Prijazni were formed in the spring of 1979 by Andrej Trobentar, who had already gained the attention of the public as a singer-songwriter. Trobentar was previously, during 1974, vocalist for the band Sedem Svetlobnih Let (Seven Light Years). After Sedem Svetlobnih Let was joined by vocalist Marko Brecelj, Trobentar left the band and formed the group Šest km na Sat (Six Km/hr), which would later evolve into Begnagrad. Na Lepem Prijazni featured Trobentar on vocals, Vojko Aleksić on guitar, Andrija Pušić on keyboards, Polde Poljanšek on saxophone, Al Stone on bass guitar and Roman Škraba on drums. At the time of the band formation, Trobetnar and Aleksić were art students, Andrija Pušić–older brother of Antonije Pušić, better known by his stage name Rambo Amadeus–had moved to Ljubljana from Herceg Novi, where he performed in hotel bands, and Stone was a British who came to Yugoslavia in 1977, and had spent some time performing with the bands Pepel in Kri and Jutro. The band soon gained the attention of the public, and was invited to perform on the twentieth edition of the Youth Festival in Subotica, alongside new wave bands Šarlo Akrobata, Idoli, Električni Orgazam, Film, Haustor and Kontraritam.

The band released their debut self-titled album in 1981 through Helidon record label. The album was produced by Braco Dolbekar, who also played saxophone and congas on the album recording. The album brought the band's vision of jazz rock, with influences of pop and reggae. Due to the track "Suckitandsee", the album was marked as kitsch by SR Slovenia censorship commission. Soon after the album was released, the band ended their activity.

In 1994, the Nika record label released the compilation album What a Time to Make a Fool of You, which featured all the tracks from the band's debut album, as well as three previously unreleased tracks.

2005–present
In 2005, Trobentar, Aleksić and Škraba reunited for two reunion performances. The performances featured, beside Trobentar on vocals, Aleksić on guitar and Škraba on drums, Matjaž Ugovšek on guitar and Kate Hosking on bass guitar. In 2005, the band, under a slightly altered name, Na Lepem Prijazni Mutant, released their comeback album, Potaplja se raj / Paradise Drowning. The album recording featured, alongside original members Trobetnar and Aleksić, Stojan Kralj (bass guitar) and Borut Praper (drums), as well as David Jarh (trumpet), Tinkara Kovač (vocals, flute) and Oto Pestner (vocals). In 2012, the band released the album Tudi če se vrnemo nazaj (Even If We Go Back), this time under the name Na Lepem Prijazni. The album fearued, beside Trobetnar and Aleksić, Jan Jarni on guitar, Darko Hočevar on bass guitar and Luka Kuhar on drums. In 2017 the album Srceder (Heartbreaker) was released. The album featured the new lineup, with Aleksić as the only remaining original member, alongside Ludvik Bagari (vocals), Boštjan Franetič (guitar), Darko Hočevar (bass guitar), Luka Kuhar (drums) and Žiga Fabbro (keyboards, saxophone).

Discography

Studio albums
Na Lepem Prijazni (1981)
Potaplja se raj / Paradise Drowning (2005)
Tudi če se vrnemo nazaj (2012)
Srceder (2017)

Compilation albums
What a Time to Make a Fool of You (1994)

Singles
"Faeton" / "Črna ovca" (1980)

References

External links
Na Lepem Prijazni at Discogs
Na Lepem Prijazni at Prog Archives

Slovenian jazz-rock groups
Slovenian progressive rock groups
Yugoslav jazz-rock groups
Yugoslav progressive rock groups
Funk rock musical groups
Musical groups established in 1978
Musical groups disestablished in 1981
Musical groups reestablished in 2005